Veratrum is a genus of flowering plants in the family Melanthiaceae. It occurs in damp habitats across much of temperate and subarctic Europe, Asia, and North America.

Veratrum species are vigorous herbaceous perennials with highly poisonous black rhizomes, and panicles of white or brown flowers on erect stems. In English they are known as false hellebores, false helleborines, and corn lilies. However, Veratrum is not closely related to hellebores, helleborines, corn, or lilies.

Ecology
Veratrum species are used as food plants by the larvae of some Lepidoptera species including Setaceous Hebrew Character.

Habitat

Widely distributed in montane habitats of temperate Northern Hemisphere, Veratrum species prefer full sunlight and deep, wet soils, and are common in wet mountain meadows, swamps, and near streambanks.

Toxicity
Veratrum plants contain highly toxic steroidal alkaloids (e.g. veratridine) that activate sodium ion channels and cause rapid cardiac failure and death if ingested. 2-Deoxyjervine is also found in these plants and is known to induce holoprosencephaly and cyclopia. All parts of these plants are poisonous, with the roots and rhizomes being the most poisonous. If ingested, symptoms, which typically occur between thirty minutes and four hours, include nausea, vomiting, abdominal pain, numbness, headache, sweating, muscle weakness, bradycardia, hypotension, cardiac arrhythmia, and seizures. Treatment for poisoning includes gastrointestinal decontamination with activated charcoal followed by supportive care including antiemetics for persistent nausea and vomiting, along with atropine for treatment of bradycardia and fluid replacement and vasopressors for the treatment of hypotension.

The toxic alkaloids are only produced during active growth, and are degraded and metabolized during the winter months. Native Americans harvested their roots for medicinal purposes during their dormant period.

Uses
Native Americans were well aware of Veratrum'''s teratogenic properties and used the plants' juices, obtained by pressing their roots, to poison arrows before combat. The roots, when dried and ground into powder, were also used as an insecticide. Western American Indian tribes have a long history of using these plants medicinally, and combined minute amounts of the winter-harvested root of these plants with Salvia dorii to potentiate the effects and reduce the herb's toxicity.

 Medical research 
During the 1930s Veratrum extracts were investigated in the treatment of high blood pressure in humans. While initial results were promising, many of the patients suffered side effects due to the narrow therapeutic index of these products. Due to their toxicity and the availability of other less toxic drugs, use of Veratrum as a treatment for high blood pressure in humans was discontinued.

 Herbal medicine Veratrum plants are known both in western herbalism and traditional Chinese medicine as toxic herbs to be used with great caution. It is one of the medicinals (Li lu, 藜蘆) cited in Chinese herbal texts as incompatible with many other common herbs because of its potentiating effects. Especially, many root (and root-shaped) herbs, particularly ginseng, san qi, and hai seng, will create and or exacerbate a toxic effect.

The roots of V. nigrum and V. schindleri have been used in Chinese herbalism, where plants of this genus are known as li lu. Li lu is used internally as a powerful emetic of last resort, and topically to kill external parasites, treat tinea and scabies, and stop itching.  Some herbalists refuse to prescribe li lu internally, citing the extreme difficulty in preparing a safe and effective dosage, and that death has occurred with dosages of as little as 600 milligrams.

Species
Accepted species

 Veratrum albiflorum: Russian Far East
 Veratrum album: Europe, Siberia, Caucasus, Turkey
 Veratrum alpestre: Primorye, Korea, Japan
 Veratrum anticleoides: Russian Far East
 Veratrum californicum: western USA; Mexico (Chihuahua, Durango)
 Veratrum dahuricum: Siberia, Russian Far East, Korea, China
 Veratrum dolichopetalum: Russian Far East, Korea, China
 Veratrum fimbriatum: California (Sonoma + Mendocino Cos)
 Veratrum formosanum: Taiwan
 Veratrum grandiflorum: China
 Veratrum hybridum (syn V. latifolium): eastern United States 
 Veratrum insolitum: Washington, Oregon, California
 Veratrum lobelianum: Russia, Mongolia, Xinjiang, Central Asia, Caucasus
 Veratrum longibracteatum: Honshu
 Veratrum maackii: Russian Far East, China, Korea, Japan
 Veratrum mengtzeanum: China, Thailand
 Veratrum micranthum: Sichuan, Yunnan
 Veratrum nigrum: Eurasia from France to Korea
 Veratrum oblongum: Sichuan, Hubei, Jiangxi
 Veratrum oxysepalum: Asiatic Russia, China, Korea, Japan, Alaska
 Veratrum parviflorum: southern Appalachians in eastern USA
 Veratrum schindleri: China
 Veratrum shanense: China, Myanmar
 Veratrum stamineum: Japan
 Veratrum taliense: Sichuan, Yunnan
 Veratrum × tonussii : Italy
 Veratrum versicolor: Korea, China
 Veratrum virginicum: central and eastern United States
 Veratrum viride: northeastern and northwestern North America (but not central)
 Veratrum woodii: south-central United States

See also

 List of plants known as lily

References

External links

 United States Department of Agriculture Plants Profile
 Jepson manual treatment

 
Medicinal plants
Melanthiaceae genera
Poisonous plants